is a Japanese politician. He became governor of Kōchi Prefecture in Japan on December 7, 2007. He is a graduate of the University of Tokyo with the Bachelor of Economics degree in 1991 and a former bureaucrat of the Ministry of the Treasury (now the Ministry of Finance). He worked in the Ministry of Foreign Affairs from 1998 to 2000. He worked as a secretary in the Embassy of Japan in Indonesia (firstly, Second Secretary and from 2001, First Secretary). He served as a secretary of the Deputy Chief Cabinet Secretary from 2006.　He retired from the Ministry of Finance in October 2007.

References

External links 
  

1967 births
Living people
People from Kōchi, Kōchi
University of Tokyo alumni
Governors of Kochi Prefecture